The Clone Wars are a series of fictional conflicts in the Star Wars franchise by George Lucas. Though mentioned briefly in the first Star Wars film (A New Hope, 1977), the war itself was not depicted until Attack of the Clones (2002) and Revenge of the Sith (2005). The Clone Wars are also the setting for three eponymous projects: a 2D animated series (2003–2005), a CGI film (2008), and a 3D CGI series (2008–2014, 2020). They have featured in numerous Star Wars books and games.

Within the Star Wars narrative, the Clone Wars involve a three-year war fought to prevent thousands of planetary systems from seceding from the Galactic Republic and forming the Confederacy of Independent Systems, often referred to as "the Separatists". The Republic uses an army of clone troopers, the namesake of the conflict, led by the Jedi Order against the Separatist battle droid army. The conflict was manufactured as a scheme for the Republic's Supreme Chancellor Palpatine, who as the evil Sith Lord Darth Sidious, was secretly manipulating the war upon the first battle of Geonosis. Palpatine secretly seeks to wipe out all Jedi upon giving the command for Order 66 at the end of the war. This would allow him to gain total power and ultimately convert the democratic Galactic Republic into the autocratic Galactic Empire, which was controlled through means of a military–industrial complex and featured in the original trilogy.

Lucas used the Clone Wars narrative to answer questions about the original trilogy, such as how the Empire originated and how Anakin Skywalker became Darth Vader. The political and military events of the Clone Wars draw inspiration from real-world conflicts and historical events, such as transition of the Roman Republic to the Roman Empire and the First and Second World Wars, as well as contemporary events such as the War on Terror and the Bush administration during the early 21st century.

Concept and development 
The first reference to the Clone Wars is in Star Wars creator George Lucas' third draft of the first film, which mentions the grizzled cyborg General Kenobi's "diary of the Clone Wars". The wars were mentioned twice briefly in the final version of the film, referring to Obi-Wan Kenobi as a general who served Leia Organa's (then-unnamed) father Bail Organa during the conflict. In drafting The Empire Strikes Back (1980), Lucas considered introducing a clone character who had been involved with the Clone Wars. Leigh Brackett's first draft of the film initially developed Lando Calrissian as a clone from a planet of clones involved in the Clone Wars mentioned in A New Hope and were nearly made extinct by the war. Boba Fett was also initially considered as being from a group of shocktroopers nearly wiped out by Jedi during the Clone Wars. However, these concepts were not included in the final version of the film. Lucas was more guarded about the details of the Clone Wars than any other element of Star Wars, even making them off-limits to licensed products and books.

Lucas has noted that Palpatine's rise to power is similar to that of Adolf Hitler in Nazi Germany; as Chancellor of Germany, the latter was granted "emergency powers", as is Palpatine. Lucas has also said that one of the primary influences for the political backdrop behind the Clone Wars, and all of Star Wars, was the Vietnam War and Watergate scandal era, when leaders embraced corruption for what they thought was the best course of action. In 2002, Lucas said:

The clone forces shown at the conclusion of Attack of the Clones comprised the largest digital army created for a film at that point. Lucas proposed to concept artists that Revenge of the Sith would open with a montage of seven battles on seven planets. Lucas then radically re-organized the plot; instead of opening the film with various Clone Wars battles, Lucas decided instead to focus on Anakin Skywalker. The absence of the "seven battles on seven planets" in part led to Lucas's decision to launch the CGI-animated Clone Wars television series; Lucas said the cartoon could "do better" at depicting the conflict.

Depiction 

The Clone Wars was first depicted in Attack of the Clones, the release of which brought an end to Lucas's embargo on licensed material set during the era. Numerous novels, comic books, and video games exploring the conflict have been sanctioned by Lucas Licensing.

Film 
The Clone Wars are first mentioned in A New Hope, when Obi-Wan explains to Luke that his father fought in them, to which Luke expresses doubt. It is later mentioned by Leia in her message that Obi-Wan served her father, who will later be identified as Bail Organa, in the Clone Wars.

Attack of the Clones, set at the beginning of the wars, opens with the Galactic Republic's rising concern about the secession of thousands of star systems to the Confederacy of Independent Systems, which is publicly led by Count Dooku. Chancellor Palpatine manipulates Jar Jar Binks and the rest of the Galactic Senate into granting him emergency powers. Investigating two attempted assassinations of Senator Padmé Amidala, Obi-Wan Kenobi discovers Dooku used the identity of a dead Jedi master to secretly arrange the creation of a massive clone army on the Republic's behalf. Yoda leads the clone army to rescue Obi-Wan, Padmé, and Anakin Skywalker from the Separatists on Geonosis, and the first battle of the war ensues. At the battle's conclusion, Yoda declares: "Begun, the Clone War has." In the final scene of the movie, Anakin and Padmé get married in secret, in violation of Anakin's Jedi vows.

Revenge of the Sith shows the waning days of the three-year Clone Wars, in which clone soldiers and their Jedi generals have fought against the Separatist droid army. After killing Dooku and rescuing Palpatine from the Separatists during their assault on Coruscant, Anakin learns Padmé is pregnant. He becomes troubled by visions of her death in childbirth, and Palpatine lures Anakin to the dark side of the Force by promising to teach him how to prevent her premature demise. Meanwhile, Yoda is dispatched to Kashyyyk to stave off a Separatist invasion, and Obi-Wan Kenobi is dispatched to Utapau where he kills General Grievous. Anakin discovers Palpatine is the elusive Sith Lord Darth Sidious, but he defends him against Mace Windu because he needs Palpatine's knowledge to save Padmé. After Palpatine murders Windu, he dubs Anakin his new apprentice Darth Vader. Palpatine orders the clone troopers to execute Order 66, and clones kill their Jedi generals across the galaxy. Palpatine then dispatches Vader to the Jedi Temple along with several clone troopers to kill the remaining Jedi and Padawans in the temple, before sending Vader to kill the Separatist leaders on Mustafar and to issue a "shutdown command" to their droid army. With their demise, Palpatine declares an end to the Clone Wars and the Republic's reformation into the Galactic Empire.

Animation

Clone Wars 

The 2D-animated Clone Wars series (2003–2005) depicts several Clone Wars battles and was meant to generate interest in Revenge of the Sith. It also depicts the prelude to the opening battle of Revenge of the Sith and Palpatine's capture by General Grievous. It was released on home video in two volumes.

The original Clone Wars TV series is no longer considered canonical, since on 25 April 2014 The Walt Disney Company declared that all the existing Star Wars works and products except for the original and prequel films and the later The Clone Wars were now part of the separate Star Wars Legends continuity.

The Clone Wars 

Several years later, Lucas chose to reboot the series as a 3D CGI series developed by Dave Filoni. After several years of production on the new television series, Lucas decided to spin off the first four episodes as a standalone film. The film, released in 2008, introduces Ahsoka Tano as Anakin's apprentice and depicts the Republic and the Separatists battling and attempting to gain permission to travel through Jabba the Hutt's territory.

The television series that followed (2008–2014, 2020) is likewise set against the backdrop of the Clone Wars, with the series finale taking place at the same time as the climax of Revenge of the Sith. The show offers additional details about the clone army's creation, establishes each of the clones as distinct characters, depicts numerous confrontations and developments from the conflict, and portrays the interaction between the clone troopers and their Jedi commanders. For example, the series reveals that each clone has an "inhibitor chip" in his body that makes most of them obey Order 66.

Novels 
The 2008 novelization of The Clone Wars by Karen Traviss begins a series of five novels by Traviss and Karen Miller published by Del Rey Books between 2008 and 2010. The Clone Wars: Wild Space (2008) was written by Miller and focuses on Obi-Wan and Bail Organa. Traviss returned to write The Clone Wars: No Prisoners (2009), in which Ahsoka is temporarily assigned to Captain Rex. Finally, Miller wrote the two-part Clone Wars Gambit (2010), subtitled Stealth and Siege, which deals with a bioweapon threat by Neimoidian general Lok Durd.

Dark Disciple (2015) novelizes a story arc about Asajj Ventress and Quinlan Vos from eight unfinished episodes of The Clone Wars. Catalyst: A Rogue One Novel (2016) is set during the Clone Wars and the subsequent couple of years. Thrawn: Alliances (2018) features flashbacks to the last year of the war featuring Anakin, Padmé, and Thrawn. Brotherhood (2022) is set during the Clone Wars, focusing on Obi-Wan and Anakin.

Comics 

Dark Horse Comics published various comics set during the era, many of which were collected in a series of trade paperbacks over nine volumes. Dark Horse also published a ten-volume graphic novella series titled Clone Wars – Adventures (2004–07), utilizing the style of the 2D animated series and depicting original stories set during the era. A series of comics tying into the 3D animated series was released from 2008 to 2010, collected in three volumes, and was supplemented by an  series of graphic novellas released between 2008 and 2013.

Marvel's comic series Kanan (sometimes subtitled The Last Padawan) depicts the Star Wars Rebels character Kanan Jarrus as Jedi Padawan Caleb Dume during the conflict.

Video games 
LucasArts also produced video games like Republic Commando and The Clone Wars that depict the Clone Wars.

Analysis

Comparisons have been made between the political aspects of the Clone Wars and the events leading up to World War II. Radio host Clyde Lewis' article on historical similarities in Star Wars claims that Palpatine's tactics parallel those of Adolf Hitler and Nazi Germany; both leaders used wars and scapegoats to manipulate society's emotional state, thus providing the leadership with support and power. Another writer compares the Clone Wars with World War II in general, basing his argument on the fact that Lucas was a baby boomer, and the dark times featured in the original trilogy rival the dark, uncertain Cold War. Referring to Lucas's statements that the conflict in Star Wars was inspired by the cultural backdrop of the Vietnam War, journalist Chris Taylor said the Clone Wars are a parallel to World War II. Anne Lancashire from the University of Toronto also points out some similar nomenclature between the Clone Wars and the American Civil War.

Several publications compared the political context of the Clone Wars to the Iraq War. In claiming that the Star Wars galaxy under the deceitful Palpatine parallels the modern issues of the United States, an editorial on Antiwar.com states that Star Wars "establishes first the generally agreeable premise that it's right to overthrow oppressive government, before bringing into focus something more discomforting – that the corrupt tyranny referred to is our own". Additionally, an article from Wiretap claims that "like Palpatine, the Bush administration has been able to feed on people's fears to gain more power". Lucas stated that the Iraq war "didn't exist" when he developed the Clone Wars, but he did see parallels between the Vietnam War that inspired Star Wars and the war in Iraq. Star Wars producer Rick McCallum corroborated that the Clone Wars was developed before the Iraq War, adding that Lucas "is a product of Vietnam".

Impact and critical response

The author of How Star Wars Conquered the Universe, Chris Taylor, calls the Clone Wars "a major part of Star Wars lore". In its attempt to keep its Star Wars line of toys active after Return of the Jedi (1983), Kenner devised a storyline that would involve the return of an exiled "genetic terrorist" and his Clone Warriors.

Timothy Zahn said the clones' unexpected appearance fighting for "the good guys" in Attack of the Clones—despite many years of fan speculation that the clones were an invading force—was "wonderfully blindsid[ing]". After seeing the CGI Clone Wars television show, Zahn was grateful that Lucasfilm rejected his initial Heir to the Empire draft, which involved an insane clone of Obi-Wan created during the conflict.

See also

 List of Star Wars Clone Wars characters

References
Footnotes

Citations

Works cited

Further reading
 Sword Fighting in the Star Wars Universe: Historical Origins, Style and Philosophy by Nick Jamilla (McFarland & Company, 2008)
 Star Wars and History by Nancy Reagin & Janice Liedl (John Wiley & Sons, 2012)
 The Science Fiction Reboot: Canon, Innovation and Fandom in Refashioned Franchises by Heather Urbanski (McFarland & Company, 2013)
 Star wars: the essential chronology by Kevin J. Anderson & Daniel Wallace (Ballantine Books, 2000)
 Culture, identities, and technology in the Star wars films: essays on the two trilogies by Carl Silvio & Tony M. Vinci (McFarland & Company, 2007)
 The Star Wars Heresies by Paul F. McDonald (McFarland & Company, 2013)

External links
 

Star Wars
Multimedia works
Star Wars: Episode II – Attack of the Clones
Star Wars: Episode III – Revenge of the Sith
Military science fiction
Cloning in fiction
Fictional elements introduced in 1977
Fictional wars